The 1999 Major League Soccer College Draft was held on February 6 and 7, 1999 in Fort Lauderdale, Florida.  The first round of the draft took place on February 6 with the second and third rounds on February 7. The College Draft was followed by the 1999 MLS Supplemental Draft later on February 7.

Round 1

Round 1 trades

Round 2

Round 2 trades

Round 3

Round 3 trades

Unresolved 1999 College Draft Trades
29 March 1997: Kansas City Wizards acquired D John Diffley from the Tampa Bay Mutiny for a conditional third-round draft pick in 1999 or 2000.
5 February 1998: New England Revolution acquired F Raul Diaz Arce from D.C. United; sent Alexi Lalas and a second-round selection in the 1999 MLS College Draft to the New York/New Jersey MetroStars; New York/New Jersey MetroStars sent second-round selection in the 1999 MLS College Draft and future considerations to D.C. United.
19 March 1998: Dallas Burn acquired a conditional selection in the 1999 MLS College Draft from Chicago Fire in exchange for defender Zak Ibsen. This may be pick #24.

References

Major League Soccer drafts
Draft
MLS College Draft
Soccer in Florida
Sports in Fort Lauderdale, Florida
Events in Fort Lauderdale, Florida
MLS College Draft